Urunga railway station is located on the North Coast line in New South Wales, Australia. It serves the town of Urunga, opening on 19 March 1923.

Platforms and services
Urunga has one platform. Each day northbound XPT services operate to Grafton, Casino and Brisbane, with three southbound services operating to Sydney. This station is a request stop for the Casino and Brisbane XPT's, so these services stop here only if passengers booked to board/alight here.

Transport links
New England Coaches service from Tamworth to Coffs Harbour operates via the station.

References

External links
Urungay station details Transport for New South Wales

Easy Access railway stations in New South Wales
Railway stations in Australia opened in 1923
Regional railway stations in New South Wales
North Coast railway line, New South Wales